"Crash and Burn" is the debut solo single by American singer Nadia Ali, released on June 17, 2008 by Smile in Bed Records. It is from her debut solo album, Embers. The single reached the top 10 of Billboards Hot Dance Club Play Chart.

Track listing

Charts

References

External links
Crash and Burn at iTunes

2008 songs
2008 debut singles
Nadia Ali (singer) songs
Songs written by Nadia Ali (singer)